John Arthur Reginald Miles  (13 May 1913 – 14 February 2004) was a New Zealand microbiologist and epidemiologist. He was in charge of the Department of Microbiology at Otago Medical School from 1955 to 1978, and became an Emeritus Professor in 1979.

In the 1971 New Year Honours, Miles was appointed a Commander of the Order of the British Empire, for services to science.

References

1913 births
2004 deaths
New Zealand microbiologists
New Zealand medical researchers
University of Otago alumni
Academic staff of the University of Otago
Presidents of the Royal Society of New Zealand
New Zealand Commanders of the Order of the British Empire
British emigrants to New Zealand